Omar Milton Campos (born 28 August 2000) is a Salvadoran footballer who currently plays as a midfielder.

Career statistics

Club

Notes

References

2000 births
Living people
Salvadoran footballers
Salvadoran expatriate footballers
Association football midfielders
Loudoun United FC players
USL Championship players
Salvadoran expatriate sportspeople in the United States
Expatriate soccer players in the United States